The 2001 SEC Men’s Basketball Tournament took place on March 8–11, 2001 in Nashville, Tennessee at the Gaylord Entertainment Center. The first, quarterfinal, and semifinal rounds were televised by Jefferson Pilot Sports, and the SEC Championship Game was televised by CBS.

The Kentucky Wildcats won the tournament and received the SEC’s automatic bid to the NCAA tournament by defeating the Ole Miss Rebels by a score of 77–55.

Bracket

SEC men's basketball tournament
2000–01 Southeastern Conference men's basketball season
Basketball competitions in Nashville, Tennessee
2001 in sports in Tennessee
College sports tournaments in Tennessee